Chinya is a small village in Mandya district of Karnataka state, India.

Location
Chinya is located between Nagamangala and Pandavapura.  It is very near to Melukote town.

Post Office
There is a post office in Chinya and the pin code is 571434.

Economy
Chinya is a village of agrarian economy.  Vijaya Bank has a branch here.

References

Villages in Mandya district